LGBT people in Abkhazia face legal challenges not experienced by non-LGBT residents.

Law regarding same-sex sexual activity

In 1933, Article 121 was added to the Criminal Code, for the entire Soviet Union, that expressly prohibited male homosexuality, with up to five years of hard labor in prison. On January 1, 1991, the Abkhaz Autonomous Soviet Socialist Republic legalized same-sex sexual intercourse.

See also

Human rights in Abkhazia
LGBT rights in Georgia
LGBT rights in Europe
LGBT rights in Asia

References

Abkhazia
Abkhazia
Politics of Abkhazia
LGBT in Georgia (country)